The 2019 Collingwood Football Club season is the club's 123rd season of senior competition in the Australian Football League (AFL). The club also fielded its reserves team in the VFL and a women's team in the AFL Women's competition.

Squad
 Players are listed by guernsey number, and 2019 statistics are for AFL regular season and finals series matches during the 2019 AFL season only. Career statistics include a player's complete AFL career, which, as a result, means that a player's debut and part or whole of their career statistics may be for another club. Statistics are correct as of the 1st Preliminary Final of the 2019 season (21 September 2019) and are taken from AFL Tables.

Squad changes

In

Out

AFL season

Pre-season matches

Regular season

Finals series

Ladder

Awards & Milestones

AFL Awards
 Anzac Medal – Scott Pendlebury (Round 6)
 2019 All-Australian team – Brodie Grundy, Scott Pendlebury

AFL Award Nominations
 2019 All-Australian team 40-man squad – Brodie Grundy, Adam Treloar, Scott Pendlebury

Club Awards
  – Brodie Grundy
  – Scott Pendlebury
  – Jack Crisp
  – Adam Treloar
  – Brayden Maynard
  – Alex Woodward
  – Jeremy Howe
  – John Noble
  – Brody Mihocek
  – Callum Brown
  – Jeremy Howe

Milestones
 Round 1 – Jordan Roughead (Collingwood debut)
 Round 4 – Chris Mayne (200 AFL games)
 Round 6 – Mason Cox (50 games (first American to hit this milestone))
 Round 6 – Jordan De Goey (100 goals)
 Round 7 – Will Hoskin-Elliott (50 Collingwood games)
 Round 8 – Jack Crisp (100 Collingwood games)
 Round 8 – Jaidyn Stephenson (50 goals)
 Round 16 – Isaac Quaynor (AFL debut)
 Round 17 – John Noble (AFL debut)
 Round 17 – Brody Mihocek (50 goals)
 Round 20 – Jamie Elliott (100 games)
 Qualifying Final – Scott Pendlebury (300 games)
 Qualifying Final – Taylor Adams (100 Collingwood games)
 Qualifying Final – Taylor Adams (50 AFL goals)
 Preliminary Final – Ben Reid (150 games)
 Preliminary Final – James Aish (50 Collingwood games)

VFL season

Pre-season matches

Regular season

Ladder

Women's season

Pre-season matches

Regular season

Ladder

Squad
 Players are listed by guernsey number, and 2019 statistics are for AFL Women's regular season and finals series matches during the 2019 AFL Women's season only. Career statistics include a player's complete AFL Women's career, which, as a result, means that a player's debut and part or whole of their career statistics may be for another club. Statistics are correct as of Round 7 of the 2019 season (17 March 2019) and are taken from Australian Football.

Squad changes
In

Out

League awards
 Rising Star nomination – Sarah Dargan – Round 4
 Rising Star nomination – Jordyn Allen – Round 7

Club Awards
 Best and fairest – Jaimee Lambert
 Best first year player – Sarah Rowe
 Players' player award – Ashleigh Brazill
 Leading goalkicker – Sarah D'Arcy (4 goals)
 VFLW Best and Fairest – Jaimee Lambert

VFL Women's
Collingwood participated in their second consecutive season in the VFL Women's league. Ruby Schleicher and Grace Buchan were named co-captains and Penny Cula-Reid coached the VFLW Magpies for the second year in a row. The Magpies claimed the minor premiership for the second year in a row, and won 12 of 14 matches. The club went on to win their inaugural premiership, defeating the Western Bulldogs by 37 points in the Grand Final at Ikon Park.

Notes
 Key
 H ^ Home match.
 A ^ Away match.

 Notes
Collingwood's scores are indicated in bold font.

References

External links
 Official website of the Collingwood Football Club
 Official website of the Australian Football League

2019
Collingwood Football Club
Collingwood